Flett is a surname, and may refer to:

 Andy Flett (born 1971), singer, songwriter and musician
 Bill Flett (1943–1999), professional hockey player
 Dave Flett (born c. 1950), British rock guitarist
 George Flett (1817–1897), Presbyterian missionary in northern Canada
 Jack Flett (1871–1932), Canadian lacrosse player
 John Smith Flett (1869–1947), Scottish geologist
 Keith Flett (born 1956), socialist historian
 Steve Flett (born 1972), singer, songwriter and musician
 Thomas Muirhead Flett (1923–1976), English mathematician
 Una Flett (1939–2021), Scottish writer and ballerina
 William H. Flett (1856–1911), American politician
 Winona Flett (1884–1922), Canadian suffragist and social reformer

See also
 Flett Glacier